The Class V 80 is a type of German diesel-hydraulic locomotive operated by the 
Deutsche Bundesbahn, that was redesignated as Class 280 from 1968. It was the first, main line, diesel locomotive with hydraulic power transmission.

History 

This type of locomotive was the first newly developed diesel locomotive built for main line service by the Deutsche Bundesbahn (DB). Only 10 examples of the class were built at the beginning of the 1950s, but it formed the basis for all subsequent DB designs in this sector.

The locomotives were initially distributed to the locomotive depots (Bahnbetriebswerke) at Frankfurt am Main and Bamberg. In Frankfurt/Main they were used on suburban services from Frankfurt/Main Hbf to Bad Homburg v.d.Höhe and to Kronberg and also hauled fast-stopping trains (Eilzüge) between Frankfurt/Main and Cologne. The Bamberg engines were used on Nuremberg’s suburban services and on various branch lines around Bamberg. From 1963 all the locos were gathered together at Bamberg and took over passenger and goods train duties on many branch lines in northern Bavaria.

The demise of branch lines in the 1970s meant that the DB could get rid of this small class of just 10 engines between 1976 and 1978, because sufficient locomotives of the comparable Class V 100 were available.

Design 

A classic feature of these engines was the driver's cab in the centre of the vehicle which could be used in both directions and which jutted out above the engine rooms.
In the basic design the V 80 had elements, that were also used on all succeeding diesel locomotive classes: a diesel engine that ran at medium-speed, hydraulic gears, power transmission via the centre axle by means of universal joints. Originally three different motors were fitted with 800 to 1000 PS; later 1,100 PS MTU motors were installed. All were supercharged V12 four-stroke diesel engines.

Italy 
After being withdrawn in Germany, the locomotives of Class 280 were largely sold to private railways and to track construction firms in Italy.

In 1959, Officine Meccaniche Italiane built a prototype diesel-hydraulic locomotive for Consorzio Cooperativo Ferrovie Reggiane. This lone prototype, later sold to Ferrovie del Sud Est had a similar aspect but shared no common parts.

Preserved 

One example, no. V 80 002, which the DB kept as a museum piece, was a victim of the big fire at the Nuremberg Transport Museum on 17 October 2005.

Since mid-October 2005 the first V 80 built by Krauss-Maffei has returned to Germany. No. V 80 001 was bought from a collector, who also owned the museum locomotive 212 203, and transferred from Italy back to Germany. It is intended to carry out a refurbishment of the locomotive as quickly as possible, so it can be made available as a museum locomotive.

As a replacement for V 80 002 which was burnt out in 2005 the DB Museum was given the last V 80 to be built, no. V 80 005, in June 2008 by its Italian owner in exchange for a Class 216 locomotive.

See also
Deutsche Bundesbahn
List of Deutsche Bundesbahn locomotives and railbuses

References

Bibliography 
 Rossberg, Ralf (2013). Deutsche Eisenbahnfahrzeuge von 1838 Bis Heute. Springer.

External links 

 The V 80
 280 001-9

V 080
B-B locomotives
MaK locomotives
Krauss-Maffei locomotives
Railway locomotives introduced in 1952
Standard gauge locomotives of Germany